The Cochrane–Africatown USA Bridge is a cable-stayed bridge carrying US 90/US 98 Truck across the Mobile River from the mainland to Blakeley Island in Mobile, Alabama.

History
The Cochrane–Africatown USA Bridge was completed and opened in 1991. It was named in honor of the 60-year-old vertical-lift Cochrane Bridge (in turn named for president of the Mobile, Alabama Chamber of Commerce at the time, John T. Cochrane, Sr.) that it replaced, and the historic community of Africatown, which was located where the western approach to the bridge was built. In 1997 community activists promoted preservation and designation of the Africatown Historic District to encourage development there. The district was included on Mobile's African American Heritage Trail in 2009. In 2012 it was added to the National Register of Historic Places.

Volkert and Associates, Inc. design for the bridge earned it the Outstanding Engineering Achievement in the U.S.A. Award from the National Society of Professional Engineers and the Award of Excellence in Highway Design from the Federal Highway Administration, both in 1992. 

This was the first, and is still the only, cable-stayed bridge in the state of Alabama. The bridge was damaged on August 29, 2005, when Hurricane Katrina broke a 13,000-ton oil platform, the PSS Chemul, free from drydock and wedged it under the bridge. The bridge remained in service and continued to carry two lanes of traffic after the storm.

References

Cable-stayed bridges in the United States
Bridges in Mobile, Alabama
Bridges completed in 1991
Bridges over the Mobile River
Road bridges in Alabama
U.S. Route 90
U.S. Route 98
1991 establishments in Alabama
Bridges of the United States Numbered Highway System